José Enrique Varela Iglesias, 1st Marquis of San Fernando de Varela (17 April 1891 – 24 March 1951) was a Spanish military officer noted for his role as a Nationalist commander in the Spanish Civil War.

Early career
Varela started his military career as an enlisted man in the Spanish Marines for three years starting in 1909. Varela initially enlisted as a recruit in the same regiment his father served as sergeant. He rose from private to the rank of sergeant and then enrolled at infantry school in Spain and graduated as a lieutenant. 

Returning to Morocco, he distinguished himself in action and King Alfonso XIII awarded him the Laureate Cross of Saint Ferdinand, Spain's highest military award, on two separate occasions, an unmatched honor for bravery in battle.  He commanded native Moroccan troops of Regulares and rose to the rank of captain by merit and participated in several campaigns in the Morocco war, the principal one being the joint Franco-Spanish amphibious landing at Alhucemas in 1925.  This landing altered the course of the Morocco War and hastened its end.  Shortly thereafter he was promoted to lieutenant colonel and to colonel at the end of the war.

During the early 1930s, he was assigned as a member of a military mission that spent time in Germany, Switzerland, Belgium and France to broaden their military knowledge. With the coming of the Republic, he participated in the abortive José Sanjurjo uprising in 1932 for which he was imprisoned.  He was released and joined the Carlists and organized the militia or the paramilitary units of the Carlists, the Requetés, into the formidable military organization that it became in the Spanish Civil War.   Disguised as a priest, Uncle Pepe, he traveled along the Pyrenean villages organizing the people and readying them for war.   He actively participated in the planning for the rising that started the Spanish Civil War.  In April 1936, the government found out about his plotting and imprisoned him.

The Civil War
In jail in Cadiz when the rising started, he was released on 18 July and helped secure Cadiz for the insurrection.  He participated in many of the campaigns of the War including, Seville, Córdoba, Malaga, Extremadura, Tagus Valley, Alcázar, Madrid, Jarama, Brunete, Teruel and the Ebro.

In Francoist Spain

Ending the war with the rank of major general, he was appointed minister of war in Franco's August 1939 government and was considered a representative of the Carlist faction there.  During his ministry the Spanish army was purged of a small number of officers and NCOs who were considered politically unreliable.

Following the fall of France in 1940 and Hitler's subsequent overtures to Franco, Varela was anti-national socialist and a leading opponent of Spanish entry into the war on the Axis side, although he did endorse the Blue Division's participation on the Eastern Front fighting the Soviet Union.

As tensions between Carlists and Falangists within the government rose during 1942, Varela suggested to Franco that Carlists were underrepresented and proposed several schemes for a reorganization of the cabinet.  Violence between the factions broke out at the Basilica of Begoña on 16 August 1942, when Falangists attacked a Carlist crowd with grenades, causing many injuries and possibly several deaths. Varela, who was inside the church at the time, took the initiative against the Falangists and portrayed the Begoña Bombing as an attack on the army and a possible assassination attempt in telegrams to officials throughout the country, displeasing Franco.  In the following cabinet reshuffle in September, Varela was replaced as army minister by General Carlos Asensio Cabanillas.

In 1945 Franco appointed Varela as high commissioner of Spanish Morocco.  He was later made captain-general of Madrid. He died of leukemia in 1951.

Franco subsequently granted Varela a posthumous marquisate title as Marquis of San Fernando de Varela. After his death he was also granted the title of Captain General of the Army, passed from the also deceased former dictator Miguel Primo de Rivera in 1951 (until 1952, when the title was granted also posthumously to the General Juan Yagüe). He is the only Spanish soldier to have risen from the rank of private to Captain General, the highest rank in the Army.

Notes

Bibliography 
 

1891 births
1951 deaths
People from San Fernando, Cádiz
Spanish generals
Carlism
Francoist Spain
Laureate Cross of Saint Ferdinand
Defence ministers of Spain
Spanish military personnel of the Rif War
Spanish military personnel of the Spanish Civil War (National faction)